Forstenrieder Allee is an U-Bahn station in Munich, Germany on the U3. It is located under Züricher Straße at Forstenrieder Allee. Before the extension of the U3 to Fürstenried West in 1991, it was the southern end station for the line. The station is accessible via six entrances, two located at the east end of the station and four at the west.

Surroundings
The commercial center of Forstenried, along with a public library and a civil office, is built around the station. The München Folk high school is also situated nearby.

References

External links

Munich U-Bahn stations
Railway stations in Germany opened in 1989
1989 establishments in West Germany